Lambis scorpius indomaris is a subspecies of sea snail, a marine gastropod mollusk in the family Strombidae, the true conchs.

Distribution
This marine species occurs off Madagascar.

References

 Bozzetti L. (1999) Lambis cristinae sp. n. (Gastropoda, Strombidae) dal Madagascar Sud-Occidentale. Malacologia Mostra Mondiale 29: 16-19.
 Bozzetti L. (1999) Lambis cristinae sp. n. (Gastropoda, Strombidae) dal Madagascar Sud-Occidentale. Malacologia Mostra Mondiale 29: 16-19.
 Steyn, D.G & Lussi, M. (2005). Offshore Shells of Southern Africa: A pictorial guide to more than 750 Gastropods. Published by the authors. Pp. i–vi, 1–289

EZxternal links
 https://www.biodiversitylibrary.org/page/49824404

Strombidae
Gastropods described in 1961